The Wake of Magellan is the tenth studio album released by the American heavy metal band Savatage. The album was released in September 1997 in Europe and Japan, and in April 1998 in the US.

This is the first Savatage album to have the same line up as the previous album since Hall of the Mountain King in 1987 and also the last to feature vocals from lead singer Zachary Stevens. The progressive metal band Dream Theater are thanked in the album's liner notes. Dream Theater keyboard player Derek Sherinian and Al Pitrelli went to college together, were both in the band Ethyl Mertz and toured with Alice Cooper for the Trashes the World tour. Pitrelli and John Petrucci also played together on a Japanese release called Guitar Battle.

Story

The Wake of Magellan is a concept album based on two real life events. The first, the Maersk Dubai incident, occurred just over a year before the album was released, when the captain and officers of the ship threw three Romanian stowaways overboard in the middle of the Atlantic. A fourth stowaway was saved by the courageous actions of the ship's boatswain, Rodolfo Miguel, who risked his own life to protect the youth after witnessing the other three murders. The second event regarded the Irish reporter Veronica Guerin, who died fighting the growth of the drug trade in her country. Her death may accomplish what she could not in life. These events are combined into the story of an old Portuguese sailor, Fernão de Magalhães (Ferdinand Magellan in English), who has decided to end his life by sailing his small boat out into the Atlantic until it sinks. In his mind he has romanticized this decision as a glorious, Vikingesque way to die. When the ocean winds push him into a great storm, and he believes that his wish is about to be granted in a great dramatic fashion, he suddenly sees a man drowning in the ocean. In an instant he finds himself taking back every wish for death's embrace, and fights to save this soul. After many twists and turns, he is able to save the stowaway that had been thrown overboard. Returning to land, he now realizes that not only every life is precious but also every hour of that life.

Reception

Matthias Breusch of Rock Hard praised the album for being "a super-melodic, varied, one hundred percent song-oriented concentrate opus, precisely made without visible weld seam", which conquered his heart after repeated listenings. He lauded Savatage for "consistently carry through their unmistakable style and yet constantly change". Metal Rules reviewer was happy to find Jon Oliva still active as lead vocalist in two songs, but considered Zak Stevens' performance that of "a vocal genius". AllMusic Stephen Thomas Erlewine's review lingered on the ambitious narrative by Paul O'Neill and remarked how "Savatage's surprisingly graceful music not only does fit the story line, but it has sweeping melodies, intricate arrangements and stunning solos that are compelling on their own terms", showing how "the group continued to improve in the '90s". Canadian journalist Martin Popoff found The Wake of Magellan "quite thick plot-wise", but appreciated how the album got "right to the metal, a decidedly raw and basic metal oddly enough", despite the band remaining "king of piano-to-riff dynamic", more in the way of Kansas than of Queen, which Savatage had been compared to.

Track listing

Personnel

Savatage

Zachary Stevens – lead vocals

Jon Oliva – keyboards, lead vocals on "Another Way" and "Paragons of Innocence", co–producer

Chris Caffery – lead and rhythm guitars, backing vocals

Al Pitrelli – lead and rhythm guitars, backing vocals

Johnny Lee Middleton – bass guitar, backing vocals

Jeff Plate – drums

Additional musicians

Bob Kinkel – additional keyboards, additional production, engineer

Production

Paul O'Neill – producer

Steve Sisco – assistant engineer

Ben Arrindell, Joe Johnson – additional engineering

Adam Parness, Ed Osbeck, Jin Won Lee, Mike Scielzi – additional assistant engineers

Dave Wittman – mixing

Kevin Hodge – mastering at the Master Cutting Room, New York

Mark Weiss – photography

Edgar Jerins – cover art

Charts

References

1997 albums

Savatage albums

Rock operas

Atlantic Records albums

Albums produced by Paul O'Neill (rock producer)

Victor Entertainment albums

Lava Records albums